Ferrieria is a genus of South American anyphaenid sac spiders containing the single species, Ferrieria echinata. It was  first described by Albert Tullgren in 1901, and has only been found in Chile and Argentina.

References

Anyphaenidae
Monotypic Araneomorphae genera
Spiders of South America